Gratton Nunatak is a bare, linear nunatak lying at the south side of the mouth of McCarthy Glacier, Antarctica, where the latter enters Reedy Glacier. It was mapped by the United States Geological Survey from surveys and U.S. Navy air photos, 1960–64, and was named by the Advisory Committee on Antarctic Names for John W. Gratton, a construction mechanic at Byrd Station in 1962.

References

Nunataks of Marie Byrd Land